Kirshbaum is a Jewish surname. Notable people with the surname include:

Larry Kirshbaum (born 1944), American publishing executive
Ralph Kirshbaum (born 1946), American cellist

See also
Kirschbaum (disambiguation)

Jewish surnames